C-Clown (short for Crown Clown) was a South Korean boy band under Yedang Entertainment. It had six members: Rome, Siwoo, Ray, Kang Jun, T.K, and Maru. They disbanded on October 5, 2015 after being together for three years.

History
Prior to his debut in C-Clown, T.K. filmed a television ad for Pepero in 2009. T.K. was also a trainee under Cube Entertainment; he was in the original lineup for the group BtoB and filmed alongside them in the sitcom I Live in Cheongdam-dong, but was pulled out of the group due to a medical condition. Another member, Rome, was a participant on Let's Go! Dream Team Season 2 for two episodes that featured newcomers/returnees to the entertainment scene.

2012-2013: Not Alone, Young Love and Shaking Heart
C-Clown released their debut mini-album Not Alone with its lead single being "Solo" on July 18, 2012. They made their debut performance following day on the Mnet  music television program M Countdown. On November 15 of the same year, they released their second mini-album Young Love. Rado, Kim Tae-ju, and Beast's Yong Jun-hyung participated in the album's production.

C-Clown released their third mini-album Shaking Heart with the lead single bearing the same name. In this album the group showed different music genres than was used in previous albums. Beast's Yong Jun-hyung participated in the album's production again on song "Do You Remember" collaborated by ALi originally released at April 2, 2013 as a digital single.

2014–2015: Let's Love and disbandment
C-Clown pre-released their track "Tell Me" a few weeks before their official comeback single. They eventually released their single "Justice" in February, showcasing a new style. On July 7, 2014, C-Clown made another comeback, releasing the MV to their title track, "Let's Love".

In April 2015, Rome changed his Instagram username to @christianyu_ and deleted all of his pictures.  The new account had the description, "they turned me into something that I am not. Never forget what I did for u,", he later shortened this to "never...forget...". These actions raised the speculation that the group was disbanding or he was at least leaving the group, but everything remained obscure. On August 13, 2015, Rome returned to Instagram and wrote another post that raised further questions about the future of the group.

On October 4, 2015, Yedang announced the disbandment. The official SNS channels (excluding YouTube), including the official C-CLOWN fan cafe, will have a grace period of a month from October 5, and become private. Rome confirmed this through several tweets on his Twitter. Yedang Entertainment said the 6th member of the group will remain under their agency, other members will work as producers under the agency while the others are preparing to form a new group.

Members
 Rome (롬)
 Siwoo (시우) 
 Ray (레이) 
 Kang Jun (강준) 
 T.K.
 Maru (마루)

Discography

Mini-albums

Singles

Notes

References

Musical groups established in 2012
South Korean boy bands
2012 establishments in South Korea
2015 disestablishments in South Korea
Musical groups disestablished in 2015